The Nigerian gerbil (Gerbillus nigeriae) is distributed mainly in northern Nigeria and Burkina Faso.

References

  Database entry includes a brief justification of why this species is of least concern

Gerbillus
Rodents of Africa
Mammals described in 1920
Taxa named by Oldfield Thomas
Taxa named by Martin Hinton